Fürstenstein  is a municipality in Bavaria in Germany.

Fürstenstein may also refer to:
 , a village and part of Wałbrzych in Poland
 Książ Castle, a castle
 , since 1848 Duke of Pless
 Fürstenstein (Fichtel Mountains), a mountain in Germany
 Prince's Stone, a coronation stone in Austria